= 2009 Liechtenstein referendums =

Reform of level I of secondary education
For	47.07%
Against	52.93%

Smoking rooms in restaurants
For	52.25%
Against	47.75%

Overturning the 2008 environmental protection law
For	57.01%
Against	42.99%
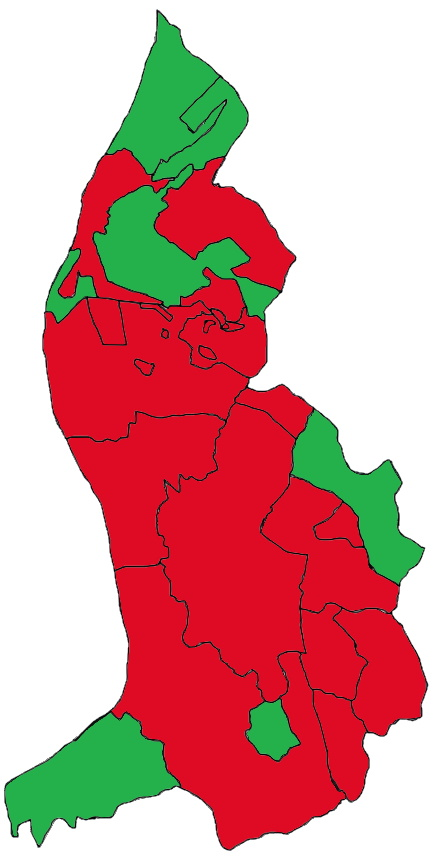
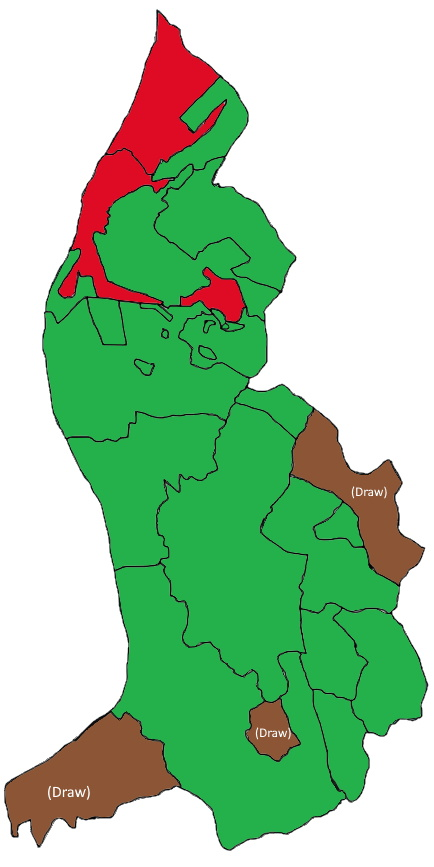
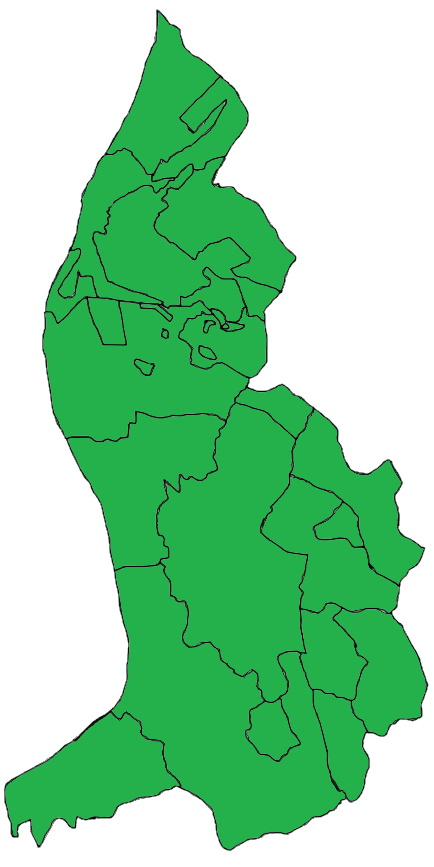
- Results by municipality for education reform (left), smoking rooms (centre) and overturning the environmental protection law (right)

Three referendums were held in Liechtenstein during 2009. The first two were held on 29 March and concerned reforming level I of secondary schooling, which was rejected by voters and the authorization of smoking rooms in restaurants, which was approved. The third was held on 6 December on a law introduced in May 2008 which placed a stricter upper level on the electromagnetic field from phone masts, and was approved by 57% of voters.

== Results ==
=== March ===
Question	For		Against		Invalid/ blank	Total votes	Registered voters	Turnout	Outcome
Question	Votes	%	Votes	%	Invalid/ blank	Total votes	Registered voters	Turnout	Outcome
Reform of level I of secondary education	6,652	47.07	7,481	52.93	810	14,943	18,502	80.76	Rejected
Smoking room	7,606	52.25	6,951	47.75	396	14,953	18,502	80.82	Approved
Source: Government of Liechtenstein, Government of Liechtenstein

=== December ===
Overturning the 2008 environmental protection law
Choice	Votes	%
For	6,765	57.01
Against	5,102	42.99
Total	11,867	100.00
Valid votes	11,867	96.16
Invalid/blank votes	474	3.84
Total votes	12,341	100.00
Registered voters/turnout	18,619	66.28
Source: Government of Liechtenstein
